Paramesotriton maolanensis is a species of salamander in the family Salamandridae. It is known only from Maolan National Nature Reserve in Libo County, southern Guizhou, China. All know specimens were collected from a deep pool, but the species probably lives in underground rivers too, that is, it is stygobitic.

Description
The eyes are reduced, possibly not functional in image forming. The head is elongated with a short, truncated snout. Skin is relatively smooth. The body is dorsally brown-black. There is a tubercular dorsal ridge that has non-continuous yellow mottling. The venter has large, irregular orange-red spots.

Habitat and conservation
The type series was collected from a large, deep pool surrounded by lush vegetation. The pool is fed by two surface streams, but it is probably drained by an underground stream that keeps the water level constant. Reduced eyes of this species suggest that it lives in the underground streams.

As of mid-2018, this species has not been assessed for the IUCN Red List of Threatened Species. The type locality is within a national nature reserve.

References

maolanensis
Amphibians of China
Endemic fauna of China
Cave salamanders
Amphibians described in 2012